Joseph F. Donnermeyer (born 5 December 1949) is a Professor Emeritus at Ohio State University, School of Environment and Natural Resources. His main subject is rural criminology. He has also a focus on Amish studies, especially on change in Amish and Old Order Mennonite communities.

His first appointment was an assistant professor in the Department of Agricultural Economics at Purdue University, with primary responsibilities as a state specialist in community development. In 1979 he became assistant professor at the Department of Agricultural Economics and Rural Sociology at The Ohio State University, where the National Rural Crime Prevention Center was established. ≤https://senr.osu.edu/sites/senr/files/imce/files/CVs/2023/vita.2023.Donnermeyer.pdf≥ In 1999 he became assistant professor in the Department of Human and Community Resource Development at the same university, where the rural sociology program was moved. In 2010, the Rural Sociology was again moved, this time to the School of Environment and Natural Resources. ≤https://senr.osu.edu/sites/senr/files/imce/files/CVs/2023/vita.2023.Donnermeyer.pdf≥

He is also adjunct professor at the University of New England in Armidale, New South Wales and the "Center for Violence Research" at West Virginia University in Morgantown, West Virginia. He is the founder and currently co-editor of the "International Journal of Rural Criminology". ≤https://ruralcriminology.org≥ IJRC is co-sponsored by the International Society for the Study of Rural Crime, the Division of Rural Criminology of the American Society of Criminology and the Rural Criminology Working Group of the European Society of Criminology ≤https://ruralcriminology.org/index.php/IJRC/about≥. The first issue of IJRC was in 2011, but it was only published sporadically until recent times when it became co-sponsored by the three professional groups. Over its history, there have been about 190,000 downloads and abstracts views of articles published in IJRC (≤https://kb.osu.edu/handle/1811/51122≥ and ≤https://ruralcriminology.org≥).

During the development of IJRC in 2011, Donnermeyer came up with the idea for a journal for publication of scholarship of the Amish and related Anabaptist groups. The first journal was published through the Knowledge Bank at OSU, with the inaugural issue published in 2013 ≤https://kb.osu.edu/handle/1811/54888≥. It was eventually replaced by the Journal of Plain Anabaptist Communities (JPAC) and upgraded to the digital journal collection of OSU libraries. The motivation for replacement of the old journal (a decision made in May, 2019) was to develop a more collaborative and inclusive publication for Anabaptist scholarship than the previous effort turned out to be. JPAC is now co-sponsored by The Ohio State University Libraries, the Young Center for Anabaptist and Pietist Studies, Elizabethtown College, Elizabethtown, Pennsylvania, and the Amish and Mennonite Heritage Center in Berlin, Ohio. The inaugural issue of JPAC was released during the Summer, 2020. Altogether, through the end of 2022, there were about 250,000 downloads and abstract views of the older journal and JPAC (≤https://kb.osu.edu/handle/1811/54888≥ and ≤https://plainanabaptistjournal.org/index.php/JPAC/about≥).

In the Autumn Semester, 2022, Dr. Donnermeyer was a Snowden Fellow at the Young Center for Anabaptist and Pietist Studies, Elizabethtown College, Elizabethtown, Pennsylvania. His Snowden lecture was titled: "Keeping Track of Settlement and Population Growth of the Amish in North America." ≤https://www.etown.edu/centers/young-center/fellows.aspx≥

Degrees
 1977  Ph.D., University of Kentucky
 1974  M.A., University of Kentucky
 1971  B.A., Thomas More College, Kentucky

References

1949 births
Anabaptist writers
Mennonite writers
Amish
American educators
American Mennonites
American sociologists
Living people
20th-century Anabaptists